The Suburban Stakes is an American Grade II Thoroughbred horse race run annually at Belmont Park in Elmont, New York. Open to horses age three and older, it is now run at the  mile distance on dirt for a $700,000 purse.

Named after the City and Suburban Handicap in England, the Suburban had its 133rd running in 2019.

Inaugurated at the Sheepshead Bay Race Track in 1884, it was run there through 1910. However, the 1908 passage of the Hart–Agnew anti-betting legislation by the New York Legislature under Republican Governor Charles Evans Hughes led to a state-wide shutdown of racing in 1911 and 1912. A February 21, 1913 ruling by the New York Supreme Court, Appellate Division saw horse racing return in 1913. Nevertheless, it was too late for the Sheepshead Bay horse racing facility and it never reopened. The race was picked up by the operators of Belmont Park where it was run in 1913. Not run the following year it was hosted by the Empire City Race Track in 1915 before returning to Belmont Park. It has remained there except for the races of 1961 to 1974 and 1976 when it was run at Aqueduct Racetrack.

The Suburban Handicap was contested at a distance of one and one half miles in 1975 and at a mile and three-sixteenths in 1976. Beginning in 1978, the race was started on Belmont Park's clubhouse turn. The event was renamed from the Suburban Handicap in 2017.

The race is the final of the three races that once composed the New York Handicap Triple series of races as it follows the Metropolitan Handicap and the Brooklyn Handicap. Four horses have won the Handicap Triple:
 Whisk Broom II (1913)
 Tom Fool (1953)
 Kelso (1961)
 Fit to Fight (1984)

The list of former winners is like a who's who of the race horse world, featuring some of American racing's greatest champions. The first mare to win the Suburban Handicap was the great Hall of Famer, Imp.

Records
Speed record:
 1:58.33 – In Excess (1991)
 1:46.58 – Mucho Macho Man (2012) (At distance of  miles)

Most wins:

 2 – Crusader (1926, 1927)
 2 – Kelso (1961, 1963)
 2 – Winter's Tale (1980, 1983)
 2 – Devil His Due (1993, 1994)
 2 – Flat Out (2010, 2013)
 2 – Effinex (2015, 2016)

Most wins by a jockey:
 8 – Eddie Arcaro (1945, 1947, 1949, 1956, 1957, 1958, 1960, 1961)

Most wins by a trainer:
 5 – Sam Hildreth (1909, 1915, 1916, 1923, 1924)
 5 – James Fitzsimmons (1922, 1938, 1951, 1956, 1958)

Most wins by an owner:
 5 – Ogden Phipps (1951, 1967, 1988, 1989, 1990)
 5 – Rokeby Stable (1973, 1978, 1980, 1983, 1984)

Winners

See also 

 Suburban Stakes top three finishers and starters

References

External links
 Ten Things You Should Know About the Suburban Handicap at Hello Race Fans

Horse races in New York (state)
Graded stakes races in the United States
Open middle distance horse races
Recurring events established in 1884
Belmont Park
Sheepshead Bay Race Track
1884 establishments in New York (state)